Orthodoxos Ioannou (born 4 March 1986 in Larnaca, Cyprus) is a Cypriot football defender who last played for Omonia Aradippou.

External links
 2014-15 CFA Stats
 

1986 births
Living people
People from Larnaca
Cypriot footballers
Nea Salamis Famagusta FC players
Anagennisi Deryneia FC players
AEK Larnaca FC players
Ermis Aradippou FC players
Othellos Athienou F.C. players
Omonia Aradippou players
Cyprus under-21 international footballers
Cypriot First Division players
Association football defenders